Risk-aware consensual kink (RACK, also risk-accepted consensual kink) is an acronym used by some of the BDSM community to describe a philosophical view that is generally permissive of certain risky sexual behaviors, as long as the participants are fully aware of the risks. This is often viewed in contrast to safe, sane, and consensual which generally holds that only activities that are considered safe, sane, and consensual are permitted.

Philosophy 
The philosophy for RACK consists of the following components:
 Risk-aware: Both or all partners are well-informed of the risks involved in the proposed activity.
 Consensual: In light of those risks, both or all partners have, of sound mind, offered preliminary consent to engage in said activity.
 Kink: Said activity can be classified as alternative sex.

While "Safe, sane and consensual" (SSC) attempts to describe and differentiate BDSM from abuse in ways that are easy for the non-BDSM public to comprehend, RACK differs from it in that it acknowledges that nothing is ever 100% inherently safe. By acknowledging that what may be safe or sane to one person may not be considered the same to another, the RACK philosophy tends to be more inclusive of activities that others may consider as edgeplay. There is no "safe" or "not safe" within RACK, only "safer" and "less safe."

RACK can also be described as a mindset which pays more attention to perhaps unexpected consequences of BDSM play. Its theory revolves around reasoned, ex-ante commitment, including the possible consequences of riskier play. In contrast, SSC revolves around the end results of play, or the ex-post. It tries to minimize any potential harm despite the risks BDSM players might be willing to partake in. Both philosophies aim to minimize foreseeable harm, but RACK puts more emphasis on individual commitment to possible risk, beforehand, while SSC tries to minimize total harm foreseeable over the longer term. Thus, RACK adherents stress the value of individual prior consent to even risky fun, while the SSC contingent counters that people often do not choose as freely as they seem, they might behave irrationally at times, and so the consequences of rash individual choice perhaps ought to be mitigated from the start.

History 

RACK was coined in reaction to dissatisfaction within the BDSM community regarding SSC. According to David Stein, the man who coined "Safe, Sane, and Consensual S/M" for New York's Gay Male S/M Activists organization, SSC was only intended to be put forward as a minimum standard for ethically defensible S/M play, to establish a distinction between play between loving S/M partners and the public perception of sadomasochism which would be more accurately described as abusive behavior. Over time, as the phrase started spreading through the larger community and appeared on bumper stickers and T-shirts, people started to associate "safe" with "risk-free," diluting the message. "Instead of asking people to think about what it means to do S/M ethically, and to make the hard choices that are sometimes necessary (if only between what's right and what's right now), many organizations today act as if these issues have all been settled, assuring us that sadistic or masochistic behavior not deemed SSC isn't S/M at all but something else — abuse, usually, or domestic violence or poor self-esteem."

In 1999, Gary Switch posted to The Eulenspiegel Society's USENET list "TES-Friends" proposing the term RACK out of a desire to form a more accurate portrayal of the type of play that many engage in. Noting that nothing is truly 100% safe, not even crossing the street, Switch compared BDSM to the sport of mountain climbing. In both, risk is an essential part of the thrill, and that risk is minimized through study, training, technique, and practice.

Variations 
Not all members of the BDSM community adhere to one principle to the exclusion of the other. Some people subscribe to both mottos, using SSC as a description of the activities to any member of the general public, while using RACK as a description of the activities within members of a community. Still others define their own terms, the term PRICK (Personal Responsibility, Informed Consensual Kink) in particular emphasizes the concept of taking personal responsibility for your actions, as well as an informed analysis of the risks. In some "old-guard" circles the term "Committed Compassionate Consensual" is circulated.

See also 
BDSM
Edgeplay
Erotic asphyxiation
List of universities with BDSM clubs
Safe, sane and consensual

References 

BDSM terminology
Consent
Sexual ethics

de:Safe, Sane, Consensual#RACK